TE1, TE-1 or TE.1 may refer to:

Aircraft 
 Albert TE.1, a French sport aircraft
 Eklund TE-1, a Finnish sport aircraft
 Temco TE-1 Buckaroo, an American military trainer aircraft

Other uses 
 TE1, a Soviet copy of the American locomotive ALCO RSD-1
 Te-1 rocket propelled mine, a Chinese naval mine
 (12305) 1991 TE1, a minor planet
 Woodlands North MRT station, Singapore